Prarabdha Karma are the part of sanchita karma, a collection of past karmas, which are ready to be experienced through the present body (incarnation).

According to Sri Swami Sivananda: "Prarabdha is that portion of the past karma which is responsible for the present body. That portion of the sanchita karma which influences human life in the present incarnation is called prarabdha. It is ripe for reaping. It cannot be avoided or changed. It is only exhausted by being experienced. You pay your past debts. Prarabdha karma is that which has begun and is actually bearing fruit. It is selected out of the mass of the sanchita karma."

Each lifetime, a certain portion of the sanchita karma, most suited for the spiritual evolution at the time, is chosen to be worked out, during the course of the lifetime. Subsequently this Prarabdha Karma creates circumstances which we are destined to experience in our present lifetime, they also place certain limitations via our physical family, body or life circumstances we are born into, as charted in our birth chart or horoscope, collectively known as fate or destiny (determinism).

Kinds of Prarabdha Karma

There are three kinds of Prarabdha karma: Ichha (personally desired), Anichha (without desire) and Parechha (due to others' desire). For a self realized person, a Jivan mukta, there is no Ichha-Prarabdha but the two others, Anichha and Parechha, remain, which even a jivan mukta has to undergo.

In Vedas
In Vedantic literature, there is an analogy. The bowman has already sent an arrow and it has left his hands. He cannot recall it. He is about to shoot another arrow. The bundle of arrows in the quiver on his back is the sanchita; the arrow he has shot is prarabdha; and the arrow which he is about to shoot from his bow is agami. Of these, he has perfect control over the sanchita and the agami/Kriyamana, but he must surely work out his prarabdha. The past which has begun to take effect he has to experience.

There is another analogy also. The granary represents the sanchita karma; that portion taken from the granary and put in the shop for future daily sale corresponds to agami; that which is sold daily represents prarabdha.

Primary literature
'Prarabdha' (Devanagari: प्रारब्ध) is employed in the Nada Bindu Upanishad verse 21 as follows in Devanagari for probity and as rendered in English by K. Narayanasvami Aiyar (1914):
आत्मानं सततं ज्ञात्वा कालं नय महामते | प्रारब्धमखिलं भुञ्जन्नोद्वेगं कर्तुमर्हसि || २१||
21. O intelligent man, spend your life always in the knowing of the supreme bliss, enjoying the whole of your Prarabdha (that portion of past Karma now being enjoyed) without making any complaint (of it).

End of Prarabdha Karma
According to many sages and philosophers, Prarabdha karma end only after we have but experienced their consequences 

Sage Ramana Maharshi presents another viewpoint when he says, "If the agent, upon whom the Karma depends, namely the ego, which has come into existence between the body and the Self, merges in its source and loses its form, how can the Karma, which depends upon it, survive? When there is no ‘I’ there is no Karma.", a point well reiterated by sage Vasistha in his classical work Yoga Vasistha, wherein, when Lord Rama asks sage Vasistha about the way to transcend the two binding effects of past karmas, namely Vasanas or the effect of impressions left on the mind by past actions and one's fate created by Prarabdha Karma, to which he replies, through with Divine grace (Kripa), one can go beyond the influences of past actions.<ref>Search for truth The Hindu, June 4, 2007.</ref>

The Bhakti Yoga theme within the Chapter seven of the Bhagavad Gita also talks eloquently about the concept of Kripa, but its most important verse comes in the final eighteenth chapter, about Liberation, where Krishna finally makes a sweeping statement to Arjuna in Verse 18.66, "Setting aside all meritorious deeds (Dharma), just surrender completely to My will (with firm faith and loving contemplation). I shall liberate you from all sins. Do not fear."

Further reading
 Living Liberation in Hindu Thought, by Andrew O. Fort, Patricia Y. Mumme. Published by SUNY Press, 1996. .
 Paths to Transcendence: According to Shankara, Ibn Arabi, and Meister Eckhart'', by Reza Shah-Kazemi. Published by World Wisdom, Inc, 2006. .

See also
Kriyamana karma
Sanchita karma

References

Karma in Hinduism
Hindu philosophical concepts

zh:隨伴業